La Grande Speranza (The Big Hope), retitled Submarine Attack and Torpedo Zone in English, is a 1954 Italian anti-war film starring Lois Maxwell, Renato Baldini and Earl Cameron. It won the Special Prize of the Senate of Berlin, and the OCIC Award at the Berlin International Film Festival. Marcantonio Bragadin was an adviser on the film, which was shot inside and on the deck of a real submarine.

Plot summary 
An Italian submarine captain conducts successful attacks on enemy merchant shipping in the eastern Atlantic Ocean during World War II, and then rescues the survivors of his victims, including a member of the Canadian Women's Army Corps (and a dog). The captain's compulsion to save his victims culminates in his taking aboard 24 additional Danish merchant seamen; with no space down below, they are accommodated under the walkway outside the hull, at risk of drowning if the submarine is forced to submerge. He then sails the survivors hundreds of miles across the open ocean on the surface to put them ashore in the Azores.

Cast
 Lois Maxwell - Lt. Lily Donald
 Renato Baldini - The Submarine Commandanti
 Carlo Bellini - Officer
 Aldo Bufi Landi - Lieutenant
 Earl Cameron - Johnny Brown, POW
 David Carbonari
 Ludovico Ceriana
 Carlo Delle Piane - Ciccio
 Edward Fleming - Jean Cartier
 José Jaspe - Spanish POW
 Paolo Panelli
 Rudy Solinas
 Henri Vidon - Robert Steiner
 Folco Lulli - Nostromo, First Mate
 Guido Bizzarri

References

External links 

1954 films
1954 war films
Films directed by Duilio Coletti
Films scored by Nino Rota
1950s Italian-language films
World War II submarine films
Anti-war films about World War II
Italian war films
Minerva Film films
Italian World War II films
Italian black-and-white films
1950s Italian films